Miguel Rodríguez may refer to:

In arts and entertainment
Miguel Rodriguez (actor) (1961–1998), Filipino actor
Miguel Augusto Rodríguez (born 1977), Venezuelan actor and model

In sport
Miguel Ángel Rodríguez (racewalker) (born 1967), Mexican race walker
Miguel Rodríguez (golfer) (born 1973), Argentine professional golfer
Miguel Ángel Rodríguez (squash player) (born 1985), Colombian squash player
Miguel Rodríguez (footballer) (born 2003), Spanish footballer
Miguel Rodríguez (table tennis), Spanish table tennis player

Other people
Miguel Rodríguez (NASA) (born 1952), Puerto Rican who is the Chief of the Integration Office of the Cape Canaveral Spaceport Management Office
Miguel Rodríguez Mackay (born 1967), Peruvian internationalist and foreign minister of Peru
Miguel Rodríguez Orejuela (born 1943), Colombian drug lord
Miguel Rodríguez Torres (born 1964), minister of the Popular Power for Interior, Justice and Peace of Venezuela
Miguel Ángel Rodríguez (born 1940), Costa Rican economist, lawyer, businessman, and politician
Miguel Rodriguez Rodriguez (1931–2001), Roman Catholic bishop

See also
Miguel Rodriguez (The Young and the Restless), a fictional character from The Young and the Restless